The Costco bear is a giant teddy bear manufactured by Hugfun International Inc. and sold primarily at Costco stores.

It weighs , and is intended for ages 3+.

Media appearances
The Costco bear has appeared in a number of television programs including:
 a commercial for Bringing Up Bates
 Jimmy Kimmel Live - January 5, 2017
 The Big Bang Theory - Season 9, Episode 20 "The Big Bear Precipitation"
 fans of the Hershey Bears tossed a Costco bear over the glass during the annual teddy bear toss
 The Seattle Children's Hospital and then-Seattle Seahawks quarterback Russell Wilson appeared in a commercial for the 93-inch plush bear

 The Teddy bears of the Gobelins in Paris

References

Teddy bears
Costco
Products introduced in 2014